is a town located in Aomori Prefecture, Japan. ,  the town had an estimated population of  7,268 in 3553 households, and a population density of 15 persons per km².

Geography

Fukaura is in Nishitsugaru District, Aomori, and occupies the far southwestern coastline of Aomori Prefecture, facing the Sea of Japan. The southwestern corner of the town is located within the borders of the Shirakami-Sanchi, a UNESCO World Heritage Site, and some coastal areas of the town are within the Tsugaru Quasi-National Park. The islets of Kyūroku-jima in the Sea of Japan are located within the boundaries of the town, giving it the westernmost point of Aomori Prefecture.

Neighbouring municipalities
Aomori Prefecture
Ajigasawa
Akita Prefecture
Happō

Climate
The town has a cold humid continental climate (Köppen Dfb) characterized by warm short summers and long cold winters with heavy snowfall. The average annual temperature in Fukaura is 7.4 °C. The average annual rainfall is 1604 mm with September as the wettest month. The temperatures are highest on average in August, at around 20.9 °C, and lowest in January, at around -4.7 °C.

Demographics
Per Japanese census data, the population of Fukaura peaked at around the year 1960 and has decreased by more than half over the past 60 years. It is now considerably less than it was a century ago.

History
The area around Fukaura was controlled by the Tsugaru clan of Hirosaki Domain during the Edo period. It became a village in Nishitsugaru District with the establishment of the modern municipalities system on April 1, 1889, and was elevated to town status on April 1, 1926. On July 29, 1955, Fukura annexed the neighboring village of Otose. On March 31, 2005, it was merged with the neighboring village of Iwasaki.

Government
Fukaura has a mayor-council form of government with a directly elected mayor and a unicameral town legislature of 12 members. Nishitsugaru District contributes one member to the Aomori Prefectural Assembly. In terms of national politics, the town is part of Aomori 3rd district of the lower house of the Diet of Japan.

Economy
The economy of Fukaura is heavily dependent on commercial fishing.

There is also a small tourism industry centered on the Shirakami Sanchi UNESCO World Heritage area, particularly the Juniko Lakes on its periphery.

Education
Fukaura has three public elementary schools and two public junior high schools operated by the town government and one public high school operated by the Aomori Prefectural Board of Education.

Transportation

Railway
 East Japan Railway Company (JR East) - Gonō Line

Highway

Sister city relations
 - Ranua, Lapland, Finland,

Noted people from Fukaura
Aminishiki Ryūji , sumo wrestler
Asōfuji Seiya, sumo wrestler
Kaihō Ryōji , sumo wrestler
Masatsukasa Kōshin, sumo wrestler

References

External links

 

 
Towns in Aomori Prefecture
Populated coastal places in Japan